Matthias Arnold (born 2 March 1997) is an Austrian professional footballer, who plays as a striker for Austria Klagenfurt in the Austrian Football First League.

Youth career
In 2003 Arnold began his career, in his hometown at the Klagenfurt AC.

In 2007, he moved to Austria Kärnten.

In 2010, after his bankruptcy, he played for Austria Klagenfurt, before he went into the AKA Kärnten 2011th In May 2014.

He completed a game in the Regionalliga for Austria Klagenfurt.

He then played in the AKA Wolfsberger.

Senior career
In October 2014, he completed the first time a game for the second team of Wolfsberger AC.

In the summer of 2015 he returned to Austria Klagenfurt, who had since been promoted to the second division.

Professional career
In May 2016 he made his professional debut, when he came on in the home game against SKN St. Pölten in the closing stages. With Austria, he had to descend to the season forced the Regionalliga.

External links 
 
 

1997 births
Living people
Sportspeople from Klagenfurt
Footballers from Carinthia (state)
Austrian footballers
Association football forwards
Wolfsberger AC players
SK Austria Klagenfurt players